Chikkalagatta is a small village of Chitradurga district. It is located about 224 km from the state capital Bengaluru and 24 from Chitradurga. The Lord Grama Devate KARIYAMMA famous in that area. And the people are very happy to pray that God for bless the people.

Villages in Chitradurga district